David Dopek (born February 8, 1973) is an American former sprinter who is noted for being DePaul University's first ever NCAA Champion, when he won the 1995 NCAA Indoor 200m title.

Dopek was named DePaul's track and field head coach in July 2010 and on Jan. 30, 2010, he was inducted into the DePaul Athletics Hall of Fame.

References

1973 births
Living people
American male sprinters
Universiade medalists in athletics (track and field)
Place of birth missing (living people)
Universiade gold medalists for the United States
Universiade silver medalists for the United States
Medalists at the 1995 Summer Universiade